The 14th United States Congress was a meeting of the legislative branch of the United States federal government, consisting of the United States Senate and the United States House of Representatives. It met in the Old Brick Capitol in Washington, D.C. from March 4, 1815, to March 4, 1817, during the seventh and eighth years of James Madison's presidency. The apportionment of seats in the House of Representatives was based on the 1810 United States census. Both chambers had a Democratic-Republican majority.

Major events

 November 1816: James Monroe defeated Rufus King in the U.S. presidential election.

Major legislation

 April 10, 1816: Establishment of the Second Bank of the United States
 April 27, 1816: Dallas tariff

Proposed, but not enacted 
 March 3, 1817: Bonus Bill of 1817 (vetoed)

Treaties 
 August 24, 1816: Treaty of St. Louis signed

States admitted and territories organized 
 December 11, 1816: Indiana was admitted as the 19th state, 
 March 3, 1817: Alabama Territory was created from a portion of the Mississippi Territory

Party summary
The count below identifies party affiliations at the beginning of the first session of this congress. Changes resulting from subsequent replacements are shown below in the "Changes in membership" section.

Senate 
During this congress, two Senate seats were added for the new state of Indiana.

House of Representatives 
During this congress, one House seat was added for the new state of Indiana.

Leadership

Senate 
 President: Vacant
 President pro tempore: John Gaillard (DR) of South Carolina, first elected December 4, 1815

House of Representatives 
 Speaker: Henry Clay (DR) of Kentucky

Members 
This list is arranged by chamber, then by state. Senators are listed by class and representatives are listed by district.
Skip to House of Representatives, below

Senate 
Senators were elected by the state legislatures every two years, with one-third beginning new six-year terms with each Congress. Preceding the names in the list below are Senate class numbers, which indicate the cycle of their election. In this Congress, Class 1 meant their term began with this Congress, requiring re-election in 1820; Class 2 meant their term ended with this Congress, requiring re-election in 1816; and Class 3 meant their term began in the last Congress, requiring re-election in 1818.

Connecticut 
 1. Samuel W. Dana (F)
 3. David Daggett (F)

Delaware 
 1. Outerbridge Horsey (F)
 2. William H. Wells (F)

Georgia 
 2. William W. Bibb (DR), until November 9, 1816
 George Troup (DR), from November 13, 1816
 3. Charles Tait (DR)

Indiana 
 1. James Noble (DR), from December 11, 1816
 3. Waller Taylor (DR), from December 11, 1816

Kentucky 
 2. William T. Barry (DR), until May 1, 1816
 Martin D. Hardin (F), from November 13, 1816
 3. Isham Talbot (DR)

Louisiana 
 2. James Brown (DR)
 3. Eligius Fromentin (DR)

Maryland 
 1. Robert G. Harper (F), January 1816 – December 1816
 Alexander C. Hanson (F), from December 20, 1816
 3. Robert H. Goldsborough (F)

Massachusetts 
 1. Christopher Gore (F), until May 30, 1816
 Eli P. Ashmun (F), from June 12, 1816
 2. Joseph Bradley Varnum (DR)

New Hampshire 
 2. Thomas W. Thompson (F)
 3. Jeremiah Mason (F)

New Jersey 
 1. James J. Wilson (DR)
 2. John Condit (DR)

New York 
 1. Nathan Sanford (DR)
 3. Rufus King (F)

North Carolina 
 2. James Turner (DR), until November 21, 1816
 Montfort Stokes (DR), from December 4, 1816
 3. Francis Locke Jr. (DR), until December 5, 1815
 Nathaniel Macon (DR), from December 13, 1815

Ohio 
 1. Benjamin Ruggles (DR)
 3. Jeremiah Morrow (DR)

Pennsylvania 
 1. Jonathan Roberts (DR)
 3. Abner Lacock (DR)

Rhode Island 
 1. William Hunter (F)
 2. Jeremiah B. Howell (DR)

South Carolina 
 2. John Taylor (DR), until November 1816
 William Smith (DR), from December 4, 1816
 3. John Gaillard (DR)

Tennessee 
 1. George W. Campbell (DR), from October 10, 1815
 2. Jesse Wharton (DR), until October 10, 1815
 John Williams (DR), from October 10, 1815

Vermont 
 1. Isaac Tichenor (F)
 3. Dudley Chase (DR)

Virginia 
 1. James Barbour (DR)
 2. Armistead T. Mason (DR), from January 3, 1816

House of Representatives

Connecticut 
All representatives were elected statewide on a general ticket.
 . Epaphroditus Champion (F)
 . John Davenport (F)
 . Lyman Law (F)
 . Jonathan O. Moseley (F)
 . Timothy Pitkin (F)
 . Lewis B. Sturges (F)
 . Benjamin Tallmadge (F)

Delaware 
Both representatives were elected statewide on a general ticket.
 . Thomas Clayton (F)
 . Thomas Cooper (F)

Georgia 
All representatives were elected statewide on a general ticket.
 . Alfred Cuthbert (DR), until November 9, 1816
 Zadock Cook (DR), from December 2, 1816
 . John Forsyth (DR)
 . Bolling Hall (DR)
 . Wilson Lumpkin (DR)
 . Thomas Telfair (DR)
 . Richard Henry Wilde (DR)

Indiana 
 . William Hendricks (DR), from December 11, 1816 (newly admitted state)

Kentucky 
 . James Clark (DR), until August 1816
 Thomas Fletcher (DR), from December 2, 1816
 . Henry Clay (DR), from October 30, 1815
 . Richard M. Johnson (DR)
 . Joseph Desha (DR)
 . Alney McLean (DR)
 . Solomon P. Sharp (DR)
 . Samuel McKee (DR)
 . Stephen Ormsby (DR)
 . Micah Taul (DR)
 . Benjamin Hardin (DR)

Louisiana 
 . Thomas B. Robertson (DR)

Maryland 
The 5th district was a plural district with two representatives.
 . Philip Stuart (F)
 . John C. Herbert (F)
 . Alexander C. Hanson (F), until ????, 1816
 George Peter (F), from October 7, 1816
 . George Baer Jr. (F)
 . Nicholas R. Moore (DR), until ????, 1815
 Samuel Smith (DR), from February 4, 1816
 . William Pinkney (DR), until April 18, 1816
 Peter Little (DR), from December 2, 1816
 . Stevenson Archer (DR)
 . Robert Wright (DR)
 . Charles Goldsborough (F)

Massachusetts 
 . Artemas Ward Jr. (F)
 . Timothy Pickering (F)
 . Jeremiah Nelson (F)
 . Asahel Stearns (F)
 . Elijah H. Mills (F)
 . Samuel Taggart (F)
 . John W. Hulbert (F)
 . William Baylies (F)
 . John Reed Jr. (F)
 . Laban Wheaton (F)
 . Elijah Brigham (F), until February 22, 1816
 Benjamin Adams (F), from December 2, 1816
 . Solomon Strong (F)
 . Nathaniel Ruggles (F)
 . Cyrus King (F)
 . George Bradbury (F)
 . Benjamin Brown (F)
 . James Carr (F)
 . Thomas Rice (F)
 . Samuel S. Conner (DR)
 . Albion K. Parris (DR)

New Hampshire 
All representatives were elected statewide on a general ticket.
 . Charles H. Atherton (F)
 . Bradbury Cilley (F)
 . William Hale (F)
 . Roger Vose (F)
 . Daniel Webster (F)
 . Jeduthun Wilcox (F)

New Jersey 
All representatives were elected statewide on a general ticket.
 . Ezra Baker (DR)
 . Ephraim Bateman (DR)
 . Benjamin Bennet (DR)
 . Lewis Condict (DR)
 . Henry Southard (DR)
 . Thomas Ward (DR)

New York 
There were six plural districts, the 1st, 2nd, 12th, 15th, 20th & 21st, each had two representatives.
 . Henry Crocheron (DR)
 . George Townsend (DR)
 . William Irving (DR)
 . Peter H. Wendover (DR)
 . Jonathan Ward (DR)
 . Abraham H. Schenck (DR)
 . Thomas P. Grosvenor (F)
 . Jonathan Fisk (DR), until March ????, 1815
 James W. Wilkin (DR), from December 4, 1815
 . Samuel Betts (DR)
 . Erastus Root (DR), from December 26, 1815
 . John Lovett (F)
 . Hosea Moffitt (F)
 . John W. Taylor (DR)
 . Asa Adgate (DR), from December 7, 1815
 . John Savage (DR)
 . John B. Yates (DR)
 . Daniel Cady (F)
 . James Birdsall (DR)
 . Jabez D. Hammond (DR)
 . Thomas R. Gold (F)
 . Westel Willoughby Jr. (DR), from December 13, 1815
 . Moss Kent (F)
 . Victory Birdseye (DR)
 . Oliver C. Comstock (DR)
 . Enos T. Throop (DR), until June 4, 1816
 Daniel Avery (DR), from December 3, 1816
 . Micah Brooks (DR), 
 . Peter B. Porter (DR), until January 23, 1816
 Archibald S. Clarke (DR), from December 2, 1816

North Carolina 
 . William H. Murfree (DR)
 . Joseph H. Bryan (DR)
 . James W. Clark (DR)
 . William Gaston (F)
 . William R. King (DR), until November 4, 1816
 Charles Hooks (DR), from December 2, 1816
 . Nathaniel Macon (DR), until December 13, 1815
 Weldon N. Edwards (DR), from February 7, 1816
 . John Culpepper (F)
 . Richard Stanford (DR), until April 9, 1816
 Samuel Dickens (DR), from December 2, 1816
 . Bartlett Yancey (DR)
 . William C. Love (DR)
 . Daniel M. Forney (DR)
 . Israel Pickens (DR)
 . Lewis Williams (DR)

Ohio 
 . John McLean (DR), until ????, 1816
 William Henry Harrison (DR), from December 2, 1816
 . John Alexander (DR)
 . William Creighton Jr. (DR)
 . James Caldwell (DR)
 . James Kilbourne (DR)
 . David Clendenin (DR)

Pennsylvania 
There were six plural districts, the 2nd, 3rd, 5th, 6th & 10th had two representatives each, the 1st had four representatives.
 . Joseph Hopkinson (F)
 . William Milnor (F)
 . Thomas Smith (F)
 . Jonathan Williams (DR), until May 16, 1815
 John Sergeant (F), from December 6, 1815
 . William Darlington (DR)
 . John Hahn (DR)
 . James M. Wallace (DR), from October 10, 1815
 . John Whiteside (DR)
 . Hugh Glasgow (DR)
 . William Crawford (DR)
 . William Maclay (DR)
 . Samuel D. Ingham (DR)
 . John Ross (DR)
 . Joseph Hiester (DR)
 . William Piper (DR)
 . David Bard (DR), until March 12, 1815
 Thomas Burnside (DR), from December 11, 1815, until April ????, 1816 
 William P. Maclay (DR), from December 3, 1816
 . Jared Irwin (DR)
 . William Wilson (DR)
 . William Findley (DR)
 . Aaron Lyle (DR)
 . Isaac Griffin (DR)
 . John Woods (F)
 . Thomas Wilson (DR)

Rhode Island 
Both representatives were elected statewide on a general ticket.
 . John L. Boss Jr. (F)
 . James B. Mason (F)

South Carolina 
 . Henry Middleton (DR)
 . William Lowndes (DR)
 . Benjamin Huger (F)
 . John J. Chappell (DR)
 . William Woodward (DR)
 . John C. Calhoun (DR)
 . John Taylor (DR)
 . Thomas Moore (DR)
 . William Mayrant (DR), until October 21, 1816
 Stephen D. Miller (DR), from January 2, 1817

Tennessee 
 . Samuel Powell (DR)
 . John Sevier (DR), until September 24, 1815
 William G. Blount (DR), from January 8, 1816
 . Isaac Thomas (DR)
 . Bennett H. Henderson (DR)
 . Newton Cannon (DR)
 . James B. Reynolds (DR)

                          David Crockett

Vermont 
All representatives were elected statewide on a general ticket.
 . Daniel Chipman (F), until May 5, 1816
 . Luther Jewett (F)
 . Chauncey Langdon (F)
 . Asa Lyon (F)
 . Charles Marsh (F)
 . John Noyes (F)

Virginia 
 . John G. Jackson (DR)
 . Magnus Tate (F)
 . Henry St. George Tucker (DR)
 . William McCoy (DR)
 . James Breckinridge (F)
 . Daniel Sheffey (F)
 . Ballard Smith (DR)
 . Joseph Lewis Jr. (F)
 . John P. Hungerford (DR)
 . Aylett Hawes (DR)
 . Philip P. Barbour (DR)
 . William H. Roane (DR)
 . Burwell Bassett (DR)
 . William A. Burwell (DR)
 . Matthew Clay (DR), until May 27, 1815
 John Kerr (DR), from December 5, 1815
 . John Randolph (DR)
 . James Pleasants (DR)
 . Thomas Gholson Jr. (DR), until July 4, 1816
 Thomas M. Nelson (DR), from December 6, 1816
 . Peterson Goodwyn (DR)
 . James Johnson (DR)
 . Thomas Newton Jr. (DR)
 . Hugh Nelson (DR)
 . John Clopton (DR), until September 11, 1816
 John Tyler (DR), from December 17, 1816

Non-voting members 
 . Benjamin Stephenson
 Nathaniel Pope
 . Jonathan Jennings, until December 11, 1816
 . William Lattimore
 . Rufus Easton, until August 5, 1816
 John Scott, August 6, 1816 – January 13, 1817

Changes in membership
The count below reflects changes from the beginning of the first session of this Congress.

Senate 

|-
| Tennessee(1)
| Vacant
| style="font-size:80%" | For unknown reasons, a Senator was not elected until after the term began.Winner elected October 10, 1815.
|  | George W. Campbell (DR)
| Took seat October 10, 1815

|-
| Tennessee(2)
|  | Jesse Wharton (DR)
| style="font-size:80%" | Appointee was not elected to finish the term.Successor elected October 10, 1815.
|  | John Williams (DR)
| Seated October 10, 1815

|-
| North Carolina(3)
|  | Francis Locke Jr.
| style="font-size:80%" | Resigned when successor was elected, having never qualified.Successor elected December 5, 1815 to finish term. 
|  | Nathaniel Macon (DR)
| Seated December 13, 1815

|-
| Virginia(2)
| Vacant
| style="font-size:80%" | Resignation of William B. Giles (DR) in the previous congress.Successor elected January 3, 1816 to finish the term.
|  | Armistead T. Mason (DR)
| Took seat January 3, 1816

|-
| Maryland(1)
| Vacant
| style="font-size:80%" | Legislature failed to elect in time for the term.Successor elected January 29, 1816 for the term.
|  | Robert G. Harper (F)
| Took seat January 29, 1816

|-
| Kentucky(2)
|  | William T. Barry (DR)
| style="font-size:80%" | Resigned May 1, 1816 after being appointed to a judicial position.Successor appointed November 13, 1816, to continue the term and then finished the term either by special election or by the appointment.
|  | Martin D. Hardin (F)
| Seated November 13, 1816

|-
| Massachusetts(1)
|  | Christopher Gore (F)
| style="font-size:80%" | Resigned May 30, 1816.Successor elected June 12, 1816, to finish the term.
|  | Eli P. Ashmun (F)
| Seated June 12, 1816

|-
| South Carolina(2)
|  | John Taylor (DR)
| style="font-size:80%" | Resigned November 1816.Successor elected December 4, 1816, to finish the term.
|  | William Smith (DR)
| Seated December 4, 1816

|-
| Georgia(2)
|  | William W. Bibb (DR)
| style="font-size:80%" | Resigned November 9, 1816 after being appointed Governor of Alabama Territory.Successor elected November 13, 1816, to finish the term, having already been elected to the next term.
|  | George Troup (DR)
| Seated November 13, 1816

|-
| North Carolina(2)
|  | James Turner (DR)
| style="font-size:80%" | Resigned November 21, 1816 due to ill health.Successor elected December 4, 1816, to finish the term.
|  | Montfort Stokes (DR)
| Seated December 4, 1816

|-
| Maryland(1)
|  | Robert G. Harper (F)
| style="font-size:80%" | Resigned December 6, 1816.Successor elected December 20, 1816, to finish the term.
|  | Alexander C. Hanson (F)
| Seated December 20, 1816

|-
| Indiana(1)
| rowspan=2 | New seats
| rowspan=2 style="font-size:80%" | Indiana was admitted to the Union on December 11, 1816.
|  | James Noble (DR)
| rowspan=2 | Seated December 11, 1816

|-
| Indiana(3)
|  | Waller Taylor (DR)
|}

House of Representatives 

|-
| 
| Vacant
| Member-elect Benjamin Pond died during previous congress
|  | Asa Adgate (DR)
| December 7, 1815

|-
| 
| Vacant
| Amos Ellmaker resigned on July 3, 1815, upon State appointment as judge 
|  | James M. Wallace (DR)
| December 4, 1815

|-
| 
| Vacant
| Seat declared vacant by the governor, “caused by the acceptance of Henry Clay to sign a commercial convention as Minister Plenipotentiary to Great Britain”, but Clay was elected to fill his own vacancy
|  | Henry Clay (DR)
| December 4, 1815

|-
| 
| Vacant
| Credentials for incumbent William S. Smith (F) were issued by the Secretary of State of New York, but Smith did not take or claim the seat, contested by Willoughby Jr.
|  | Westel Willoughby Jr. (DR)
| December 13, 1815

|-
| 
| Vacant
| Credentials for John Adams (F) were issued by the Secretary of State of New York, but Adams did not take or claim the seat, contested by Root
|  | Erastus Root (DR)
| December 26, 1815

|-
| 
|  | Nicholas R. Moore (DR)
| Resigned sometime in 1815 before Congress convened
|  | Samuel Smith (DR)
| February 4, 1816

|-
| 
|  | Jonathan Fisk (DR)
| Resigned sometime in March, 1815, upon appointment as United States Attorney for the Southern District of New York
|  | James W. Wilkin (DR)
| December 4, 1815

|-
| 
|  | David Bard (DR)
| Died March 12, 1815
|  | Thomas Burnside (DR)
| December 11, 1815

|-
| 
|  | Jonathan Williams (DR)
| Died May 16, 1815
|  | John Sergeant (F)
| December 6, 1815

|-
| 
|  | Matthew Clay (DR)
| Died May 27, 1815
|  | John Kerr (DR)
| December 5, 1815

|-
| 
|  | John Sevier (DR)
| Died September 24, 1815
|  | William G. Blount (DR)
| January 8, 1816

|-
| 
|  | Nathaniel Macon (DR)
| Resigned December 13, 1815, after being elected to the U.S. Senate
|  | Weldon N. Edwards (DR)
| February 7, 1816

|-
| 
|  | Alexander C. Hanson (F)
| Resigned sometime in 1816
|  | George Peter (F)
| October 7, 1816

|-
| 
|  | John McLean (DR)
| Resigned sometime in 1816
|  | William Henry Harrison (DR)
| December 2, 1816

|-
| 
|  | Peter B. Porter (DR)
| Resigned January 23, 1816
|  | Archibald S. Clarke (DR)
| December 2, 1816

|-
| 
|  | Elijah Brigham (F)
| Died February 22, 1816
|  | Benjamin Adams (F)
| December 2, 1816

|-
| 
|  | Thomas Burnside (DR)
| Resigned April, 1816
|  | William P. Maclay (DR)
| December 3, 1816

|-
| 
|  | Richard Stanford (DR)
| Died April 9, 1816
|  | Samuel Dickens (DR)
| December 2, 1816

|-
| 
|  | William Pinkney (DR)
| Resigned April 18, 1816, upon appointment as Minister Plenipotentiary to Russia
|  | Peter Little (DR)
| December 2, 1816

|-
| 
|  | Daniel Chipman (F)
| Resigned May 5, 1816
| colspan=2 | Vacant until next Congress

|-
| 
|  | Enos T. Throop (DR)
| Resigned June 4, 1816
|  | Daniel Avery (DR)
| December 3, 1816

|-
| 
|  | Thomas Gholson Jr. (DR)
| Died July 4, 1816
|  | Thomas M. Nelson (DR)
| December 4, 1816

|-
| 
|  | James Clark (DR)
| Resigned sometime in August, 1816
|  | Thomas Fletcher (DR)
| December 2, 1816

|-
| 
| Rufus Easton
| Served throughout the first session; Scott presented credentials at the beginning of the second session and was contested by Easton
| John Scott
| December 2, 1816

|-
| 
| Benjamin Stephenson
| Term ended September 3, 1816
| Nathaniel Pope
| December 2, 1816

|-
| 
|  | John Clopton (DR)
| Died September 11, 1816
|  | John Tyler (DR)
| December 17, 1816

|-
| 
|  | William Mayrant (DR)
| Resigned October 21, 1816
|  | Stephen D. Miller (DR)
| January 2, 1817

|-
| 
|  | William R. King (DR)
| Resigned November 4, 1816
|  | Charles Hooks (DR)
| December 2, 1816

|-
| 
|  | Alfred Cuthbert (DR)
| Resigned November 9, 1816
|  | Zadock Cook (DR)
| January 23, 1817

|-
| 
| Jonathan Jennings (Territorial delegate)
| Indiana was admitted to the Union on December 11, 1816
|  | William Hendricks (DR)
| December 11, 1816

|-
| 
| John Scott
| His election was contested by his predecessor Easton. On January 13, 1817, the election was declared illegal, but the seat was declared vacant.
| Vacant until next Congress

|}

Committees
Lists of committees and their party leaders.

Senate

 Attorney General's Office (Select) 
 Audit and Control the Contingent Expenses of the Senate (Chairman: Abner Lacock)
 Claims (Chairman: Jonathan Roberts)
 Commerce and Manufactures (Chairman: William Hunter)
 Compensation of Members of Congress (Select) 
 District of Columbia (Chairman: Armistead Mason)
 Engrossed Bills (Chairman: Eligius Fromentin)
 Finance (Select) 
 Indiana Admission to the Union (Select) 
 Judiciary (Chairman: Dudley Chase)
 Military Affairs (Chairman: John Williams)
 Militia (Chairman: Joseph Varnum)
 Memorial of the Mississippi Territory (Chairman: N/A)
 National University (Chairman: N/A)
 Naval Affairs (Chairman: Charles Tait)
 Pensions (Chairman: Jeremiah Howell)
 Post Office and Post Roads (Chairman: James J. Wilson)
 Public Lands (Chairman: Jeremiah Morrow)
 Slave Trade (Select)
 Weights and Measures (Select)
 Whole

House of Representatives

 Accounts (Chairman: John McLean then Peter Little)
 Assent of Congress to an Act of the Virginia Legislature (Select) 
 Attorney General's Office (Select) 
 Banks of the District of Columbia (Select) 
 Berkshire Association (Select) 
 Bible Society of Philadelphia (Select) 
 Bonus of the National Banks (Select) 
 Bounty Lands Communication (Select) 
 Claims (Chairman: Bartlett Yancey)
 Commerce and Manufactures (Chairman: Thomas Newton Jr.)
 District of Columbia (Chairman: Henry S. Tucker)
 Elections (Chairman: John W. Taylor)
 Expenditures in the Navy Department (Chairman: Stevenson Archer)
 Expenditures in the Post Office Department (Chairman: Newton Cannon)
 Expenditures in the State Department (Chairman: John B. Yates)
 Expenditures in the Treasury Department (Chairman: Samuel Smith)
 Expenditures in the War Department (Chairman: Erastus Root)
 Expenditures on Public Buildings (Chairman: Lewis Condict) 
 Judiciary (Chairman: Hugh Nelson)
 Pensions and Revolutionary Claims (Chairman: John J. Chappell)
 Post Office and Post Roads (Chairman: Samuel D. Ingham)
 Private Land Claims (Chairman: Solomon P. Sharp)
 Public Expenditures (Chairman: William H. Murfree then Israel Pickens)
 Public Lands (Chairman: Thomas B. Robertson)
 Revisal and Unfinished Business (Chairman: Lewis Condict)
 Rules (Select) 
 Standards of Official Conduct 
 Ways and Means (Chairman: William Lowndes)
 Whole

Joint committees

 Enrolled Bills

Employees

Legislative branch agency directors 
 Architect of the Capitol: Benjamin Latrobe, from April 6, 1815
 Librarian of Congress: George Watterston

Senate 
 Chaplain: Jesse Lee (Methodist), until December 8, 1815
 John Glendie (Presbyterian), elected December 8, 1815
 Sereno Edwards Dwight, (Congregationalist) elected December 16, 1816
 Secretary: Charles Cutts
 Sergeant at Arms: Mountjoy Bayly

House of Representatives 
 Chaplain: Obadiah B. Brown (Baptist), until December 7, 1815
 Spencer H. Cone (Baptist), December 7, 1815 – December 2, 1816
 Burgiss Allison (Baptist), elected December 2, 1816
 Clerk: Thomas Dougherty
 Doorkeeper: Thomas Claxton
 Reading Clerks: 
 Sergeant at Arms: Thomas Dunn

See also 
 1814 United States elections (elections leading to this Congress)
 1814–15 United States Senate elections
 1814–15 United States House of Representatives elections
 1816 United States elections (elections during this Congress, leading to the next Congress)
 1816 United States presidential election
 1816–17 United States Senate elections
 1816–17 United States House of Representatives elections

Notes

References

External links
 Statutes at Large, 1789–1875
 Senate Journal, First Forty-three Sessions of Congress
 House Journal, First Forty-three Sessions of Congress
 Biographical Directory of the U.S. Congress
 U.S. House of Representatives: House History
 U.S. Senate: Statistics and Lists